The 1973 Atlantic Coast Conference baseball tournament was the inaugural Atlantic Coast Conference (ACC) baseball tournament. It was held in Chapel Hill, North Carolina, from April 19 – April 22, 1973.  won the tournament and earned the ACC's automatic bid to the 1973 NCAA University Division baseball tournament.

Tournament

See also
College World Series
NCAA Division I Baseball Championship

References

2. 2007 ACC Baseball Media Guide

Tournament
Atlantic Coast Conference baseball tournament
Atlantic Coast Conference baseball tournament
Atlantic Coast Conference baseball tournament
College baseball tournaments in North Carolina
Baseball competitions in Chapel Hill, North Carolina